DPPE may refer to the chemicals:

 1,2-Bis(diphenylphosphino)ethane
 Dipalmitoylphosphatidylethanolamine